A needleman or needlewoman is a person who practices the handicraft or profession of needlework. Another term that may be used is needleworker.

Needleman may refer to:
Needleman (surname)
Needleman (Dungeons & Dragons), creature in the Dungeons & Dragons series
Needle Man, a boss in the video game Mega Man 3

Needlewoman may refer to:
The Needlewoman, a painting by Diego Velázquez